Moxoene or Mokk' was a territory of Kingdom of Armenia and later Sasanian Armenia, located east of Arzanene from south of Lake Van to north of Bohtan river. The territory was ruled by a local dynasty.

Toponymy 
The name Moxoene only appears in ancient sources in the early fourth century. In later centuries, Armenian sources used the name Mokkʿ. The ancient name is preserved in modern times with the local Kurds using the name Miks for the main town of the area. Attempts have been made to find the pre-Armenian attestations of Moxoene and some ethnonyms have been suggested including Μύκοι by Herodotus, Muški from Assyrian sources and τῶν Μοσχικῶν ὄρη or Μοξιανοί by Ptolemy as attested by him in Geography. However, none of these fit the geographical and linguistic criteria.

History 

In 198, Moxoene was emerged into Corduene.

During the Battle of Samarra in 363, Roman soldiers likely marched through Moxoene under generals Procopius and Sebastianus to join Arshak II. During the territorial negotiations that same year, the Sasanian Empire demanded the area of Moxoene. After the war, Moxoene emerged as a new political entity part of the Sasanian Empire. The diocese of Moxoene belonged to Nestorianism.

The settlement was known in Roman times as Moxos, after the 8th century as Mokks or Moks, and after the 18th century as Mukus. Moxoene may have been named after the Bronze Age Mushki people, who according to Assyrian sources, settled in the region.

Notes

References 

 

 

Provinces of the Kingdom of Armenia (antiquity)
History of Van Province
History of Kurdistan
States and territories established in the 360s